In the largest group of the Latter Day Saint movement, The Church of Jesus Christ of Latter-day Saints (LDS Church), folklore is usually distinguished from church doctrine, but there is no universally accepted method of determining where doctrine ends and folklore begins. Most Latter-day Saints consider material in the church's scriptures and joint statements of the First Presidency and Quorum of the Twelve Apostles to constitute church doctrine. Any other part of the expressive cultural aspects of Mormonism may be legitimately classified as Mormon folklore.

Leaders of the LDS Church have preached against the propagation of folklore and other rumors. In a 1972 general conference address, church president Harold B. Lee encouraged members to verify incredible stories with church authorities before passing them on.

On scriptural themes
 that Cain, the killer of Abel, is still alive and wanders the earth as punishment for killing Abel, wearing no clothing but being covered by hair, and that apostle David W. Patten encountered him once, and that reported sightings of Bigfoot can be explained by this story
 that the global flood of Noah (the builder of Noah's Ark) constituted the baptism of the Earth
 that Jesus was married, possibly to Mary Magdalene; Mary, sister of Lazarus; and/or Martha, and that Jesus may have been a polygamist and had children
 that Jesus was born on 6 April 
 modern encounters and assistance from one or more of "The Three Nephites", three Nephite disciples chosen by Jesus in the Book of Mormon, who were blessed by Jesus to "never taste of death; but ye shall live to behold all the doings of the Father unto the children of men".

In church history

 that the writings of the early Church Fathers conform better with Mormonism than with modern Christianity
 that in 1739 a Roman Catholic monk predicted that within 100 years an angel would be sent by God to restore the lost gospel to the earth and that the true church would be established in "a valley that lies towards a great lake", for Mormons the angel was Angel Moroni, the "lost gospel" was the Book of Mormon which Joseph Smith (who lived in the 1800s) translated from the Golden plates that Moroni gave him, the "true church" was the LDS Church founded by Smith with its location matching up with the LDS Church's modern headquarters in Utah where the "valley" is the Salt Lake Valley and the "lake" is the Great Salt Lake
that the "great and abominable church" described in the Book of Mormon can be identified as the Roman Catholic Church.
 the miracle of the gulls, in which the crops of early Mormon settlers in Utah Territory were saved from destruction by a vast flock of seagulls that ate swarms of Mormon crickets that were devouring the crops
 that a flash of lightning or other divine manifestation protected the body of Joseph Smith from being mutilated by a mob after he had been killed at Carthage Jail
 that those who persecuted the early Latter Day Saints and killed Joseph Smith suffered physically and mentally later in their lives, with some meeting gruesome or particularly painful deaths
 that Orson Hyde, an early apostle of the church, was of Jewish ancestry and that for this reason it was he in 1841 that dedicated Palestine for the return of the Jews
 that when speaking to the Latter Day Saints after the death of Joseph Smith, Brigham Young took on the appearance, voice, and mannerisms of Smith and that this was a sign from God that Young was to be Smith's successor
 that Albert Einstein said that geologist and LDS Church apostle James E. Talmage was the smartest man he had ever met
 that Māori prophets or chieftains, including Paora Te Potangaroa and Tāwhiao, predicted the coming of Mormon missionaries to New Zealand
 that Del Parson's painting "Christ in Red Robe" was produced under the direction of church general authorities, who suggested how to make it more accurate, until it was deemed the closest resemblance of Jesus Christ
 that a geological feature in Millard County, Utah, known as the "Great Stone Face" resembles a profile of Joseph Smith's face
 that various theories explain reasons for the priesthood ban on black people holding the priesthood before the 1978 Revelation on Priesthood, even when these reasons are repudiated by LDS Church leaders and scholars
that the curse of Cain or the curse of Ham justified the racial restriction policy
that they were neutral in the War in Heaven
that it was done in order to protect them from the lowest rung of hell, since one of few damnable sins is to abuse the exercise of the priesthood

On temples

 that in designing the Salt Lake Temple, Brigham Young had the foresight to make space accommodation for future technological advancements such as elevators, air conditioning, and electrical wiring
 that on December 7, 1941, Japanese aircraft pilots attempted to bomb or strafe the church's Hawaiian Temple just prior to or just after the attack on Pearl Harbor, but were prevented from doing so by mechanical failures or an unseen protective force, and that the Japanese pilot who attempted to bomb or strafe the Hawaiian Temple was converted to the LDS Church after he saw a picture of the temple in the possession of Mormon missionaries in Japan
 that Tāwhiao accurately predicted the site of the 1958 Hamilton New Zealand Temple before his death in 1894;
 that the Freiberg Germany Temple, which was the first Mormon temple in a Communist state when it was dedicated in East Germany in 1985 (at that time, the temple was called the "Freiberg GDR Temple", from "German Democratic Republic", East Germany's official name) by its very presence in the country had hastened the fall of the communist regime in 1989 which in turn led to its reunification with West Germany to form modern-day Germany, the Freiberg area's prosperity in the relatively poor eastern Germany is also attributed to the temple's location in the city
 that officials of the Roman Catholic Church supported the LDS Church's efforts to build the Rome Italy Temple and that this support was forthcoming because of the church's support of Proposition 8 in California in 2008
 that wearing temple garments affords physical protection, and that some wearers have survived car wrecks, floods, and other calamities unscathed thanks to the protective power of the garments

About the pre-existence
Pre-existence is the Mormon belief that human souls exist in a pre-mortal form before birth.

 That today's youth were "generals" in the War in Heaven and that when they return to heaven they will be revered.

Predictions

The following are examples of predictions or prophecies that are part of Mormon folklore:
 that the church will reinstitute the practice of plural marriage before the second coming.
 that the day will come that the United States Constitution will "hang by a thread" and that members of the church will be central in rescuing it and the United States from destruction. (See also: White Horse Prophecy)
 that after the Ten Lost Tribes return, they will assist in building the Temple of the New Jerusalem on the Temple Lot in Independence, Missouri. The tenth Article of Faith of the Latter Day Saint movement states that members believe in the "literal gathering of Israel and the restoration of the Ten Tribes" (see House of Joseph (LDS Church));
 that God will restore the Adamic language.
 that the Dream Mine will provide financial relief for believers in Utah after the disasters leading up to the Second Coming.

See also
Culture of The Church of Jesus Christ of Latter-day Saints
Symbolism in The Church of Jesus Christ of Latter-day Saints

Notes

References

 Allred, David A. Representing Culture: Reflexivity and Mormon Folklore Scholarship. Thesis. Brigham Young University, March 2000.
 
 .
 .
 .
 .
 .
 .
 .
 
 
 .
 .
 
 .

American folklore
Latter Day Saint culture
Mormon folklore
Mormon studies
Mormon folk beliefs